is, in Japanese mythology, the world between Takamagahara (Heaven) and Yomi (Hell). In time, the term became another word for the country or the location of Japan. The term can be used interchangeably with Toyoashihara no Nakatsukuni (豊葦原中国). There is a great dispute among historians about where exactly in Japan the term originally referred to.

Perhaps the term was considered appropriate to describe Japan because the land was damp and covered with reeds (葦) in ancient times. The meaning of 中 (middle) in the word 中つ国 is based upon the world view of ancient peoples, where 中つ国 indicates the real world or country between Takamagahara in the heavens and Yomi no kuni in the netherworld.

References

See also
 Upper World (Greek)
 Aaru

Names of Japan
Locations in Japanese mythology